The 2020 Houston Dash season is the team's seventh season as an American professional women's soccer team in the National Women's Soccer League.

On January 6, 2020, the Dash traded team captain Kealia Ohai to the Chicago Red Stars, Ohai had been a member of the Dash since their inaugural season and is the team's all-time leading scorer.

Competitions
Due to the COVID-19 pandemic the NWSL did not hold a regular season as originally scheduled. The season was replaced by the 2020 NWSL Challenge Cup in July and the Fall Series in September and October.

2020 NWSL Challenge Cup
Houston won the NWSL Challenge Cup after defeating the Chicago Red Stars 2–0 in the Championship Game. Dash forward Rachel Daly was named the Challenge Cup MVP.

Preliminary round

Knockout round

Fall Series
The Dash would be without Challenge Cup MVP Rachel Daly for the Fall series as she was loaned to West Ham United for the remainder of 2020. Midfielder CeCe Kizer would also miss the fall series as she was loaned to Kolbotn IL in Norway.

Fall Series Match Results

Club

Roster

Player Transactions

Transfers In

Transfers Out

References

External links

See also
 2020 National Women's Soccer League season
 2020 in American soccer

Houston Dash
Houston Dash
Houston Dash seasons